Allan C. Carr (c.1929–November 12, 2021) was an American politician who served as Cook County commissioner from 1988 to 2002, serving from suburban Cook County at-large from 1988–1994 and from the 16th district from 1994–2002. Before this, he served as Cicero city clerk, as well as its committeeman.

Business career
Carr became a wealthy restaurant operator. He started the Steak-N-Egger chain.

Political career
Carr began to engage in Cicero's politics in 1976. In 1976, he backed Christy Berkos for town president (mayor). She won as an independent, defeating the candidate of John Kimbark's Republican organization. Carr became a Cicero town trustee.

Carr later served as Cicero town clerk. He was also the head of the regular Republican organization of Cicero as its committeeman. He had been the successor of John Kimbark in these positions, and was Kimbark's chosen successor, named two days before Kimbark's death, which surprised many as they had long been strong enemies. Carr also served as Cicero's library director during this time.

In 1988, Carr was appointed to the Cook County Board of Commissioners from suburban Cook County. The six Republican commissioners from the suburbs appointed Carr to succeed retiring Commissioner Joseph Woods of Oak Park. He was reelected in 1990. He was elected to the 16th district in 1994 when the board switched to single-member constituencies, and was reelected in 1998. In 2002 he was defeated for reelection in the Republican primary by Tony Peraica. Peraica had been supported by Betty Loren-Maltese and Edward Vrdolyak, each of whom held grudges against Carr. Peraica had previously run against Carr unsuccessfully in 1994 as a Democrat.

In 1994, Betty Loren-Maltese made Carr, who up until then had been considered an ally of hers and to whom she arguably owed her original election as Cicero town president, step down from his position as committeeman so that she could take his place and consolidate her control over the Town of Cicero Republican Organization.

In 2010, Carr and his family supported Democrat Jeff Tobolski's successful campaign to unseat Peraica in Carr's former seat on the Cook County Board of Commissioners.

Personal life
Carr's son Terrence M. "Terry" Carr, Sr. served as the longtime mayor of Willow Springs, Illinois, he was a trustee of Willow Springs and a member of the board of Pace. In April 2020, Terry's own son, Terrance M. "Terry" Carr, Jr., was sworn-in as acting mayor of McCook, Illinois.

Electoral history

Cook County Board of Commissioners
1990

1994

1998

2002

Cicero Township committeeman

References

20th-century births
2021 deaths
Year of birth uncertain
Place of birth missing
Members of the Cook County Board of Commissioners
Illinois Republicans